Five Pillars or five pillars may refer to:

Five Pillars of Islam, often regarded as basic religious acts of Muslim life
Five pillars puzzle, a mechanical puzzle also known as Baguenaudier and five pillars problem
Five Pillars of cyber security, the framework for the United States military cyberwarfare
Five Pillars of Reform in the Modernising Government Programme in India
Five Pillars of Statesmanship and 5 Pillar Certification in the Thomas Jefferson Education methodology
Five Pillars of success at the St. Richard's Episcopal School
The five pillars of the Third Industrial Revolution, a theory by Jeremy Rifkin
Five pillars of the Delta Xi Phi sorority at the University of Illinois
Five pillars of the Armenian Youth Federation

See also 
Four Pillars (disambiguation)
Sixth Pillar of Islam
Seven pillars (disambiguation)